Phyllophryno is a genus of parasitic flies in the family Tachinidae.

Species
Phyllophryno antennalis Townsend, 1927

Distribution
Peru.

References

Diptera of South America
Monotypic Brachycera genera
Exoristinae
Tachinidae genera
Taxa named by Charles Henry Tyler Townsend